Gardene is a village in Auri Parish and Dobele Municipality in the historical region of Zemgale, and the Zemgale Planning Region in Latvia.
It is the site of a former Soviet military base.

Dobele Municipality
Towns and villages in Latvia